Margaret Court defeated Billie Jean King in the final, 14–12, 11–9 to win the ladies' singles tennis title at the 1970 Wimbledon Championships. It was her third Wimbledon singles title, her third major singles title of the year, and her 19th major singles title overall. Court became the first woman to complete a career Grand Slam in the Open Era, and would later win the US Open, thus also becoming the first woman to win the Grand Slam in the Open Era.

Ann Jones was the reigning champion, but she did not defend her title as she had retired from major singles competition.

Seeds

  Margaret Court (champion)
  Billie Jean King (final)
  Virginia Wade (fourth round)
  Kerry Melville (fourth round)
  Rosie Casals (semifinals)
  Julie Heldman (fourth round)
  Karen Krantzcke (quarterfinals)
  Helga Niessen (quarterfinals)

Qualifying

Draw

Finals

Top half

Section 1

Section 2

Section 3

Section 4

Bottom half

Section 5

Section 6

Section 7

Section 8

References

External links

1970 Wimbledon Championships – Women's draws and results at the International Tennis Federation

Women's Singles
Wimbledon Championship by year – Women's singles
Wimbledon Championships
Wimbledon Championships